Comet Bay College is a public co-educational high school, located in Secret Harbour,  south of Perth, Western Australia. Established in 2006 at the premises now occupied by Comet Bay Primary School, the College moved to its present location south of the primary school in 2007. In 2020 the school for the first time ranked academically within the top ten public secondary schools in the state.

History 
The college was initially a junior high school accommodating years 8 to 10. The first stage of construction of the school was completed in May/June 2006. In November 2007 the Minister for Education announced that years 11 and 12 would be accommodated in 2008 and 2009 respectively. In 2011 a $20.5 million building program for senior school facilities was completed, including science laboratories, a lecture theatre, trades area and a fitness centre.

The school consists of a block for each subject, a gymnasium, a library, an oval, a cafeteria, a Performing Arts area, and an Admin area. The school has an Academic Excellence Program - Academic Talent Program (originally called ATP, then SAP-Selective Academic Program, then GATE-Gifted and Talented Education, currently GAT-Gifted and Talented) which produces outstanding students, AFL football and golf development programs, Drama and Visual Arts extension programs, Music programs and a Media extension program.

Catchment area
The school's intake area includes all students of high school age from Secret Harbour, Golden Bay, Singleton, Baldivis, Karnup and a small section of southern Port Kennedy. Its feeder primary schools are Baldivis, Comet Bay, Endeavour, Secret Harbour, Singleton and Settlers. Students from the suburb of Madora Bay have the option of attending Comet Bay College or Mandurah High School.

See also

 List of schools in rural Western Australia

References

External links
 Donaldson and Warn page

Public high schools in Western Australia
2007 establishments in Australia
Educational institutions established in 2007
City of Rockingham